The second government of Javier Lambán was formed on 7 August 2019, following the latter's election as President of the Government of Aragon by the Cortes of Aragon on 31 July and his swearing-in on 3 August, as a result of the Spanish Socialist Workers' Party (PSOE) emerging as the largest parliamentary force at the 2019 regional election.

The cabinet comprises members of the PSOE, Podemos, Aragonese Union (CHA) and Aragonese Party (PAR).

Investiture

Cabinet changes
Lambán's second government saw a number of cabinet changes during its tenure:
On 12 May 2020, Health minister Pilar Ventura announced her resignation, effective the next day, as a result of fiery protests of health personnel, unions and associations throughout the region following some controversial statements in which she claimed that making protection material with garbage bags amidst the COVID-19 pandemic "stimulated" sanitarians. She was replaced in her post by Sira Repollés on 15 May.

Council of Government
The Government of Aragon is structured into the offices for the president, the vice president and nine ministries.

Notes

References

2019 establishments in Aragon
Cabinets established in 2019
Cabinets of Aragon
Current governments